The Light Of The Spirit is a Kitarō studio album co-produced by the Grateful Dead drummer, Mickey Hart. The album received a Grammy nomination for the single "The Field".

Track listing

Personnel
Musicians
Kitaro - arranger 
Hiroshi Araki - guitar
Bobby Black - pedal steel guitar, guitar
David Grisman - mandolin
Mickey Hart - percussion, special effects
Tomoyuki Hayashi - keyboards
Zakir Hussain - percussion
David Jenkins - guitar
Jose Lorenzo - percussion
John Meyer - flute
Lynn Ray - vocals
Jeff Sterling - synthesizer
Jeanie Tracy - vocals
Norihiro Tsuru - violin
Bobby Vega - bass guitar

Credits
Producer - Kitaro, Mickey Hart
Mixing - Kitaro
Engineer - Tom Flye
Programming, operation - Jeff Sterling
Assistant engineer - Tom Size
Assistant producer - Ruriko Sakumi
Design - Laura LiPuma
Photography - Yukio Ohyam, Ryuzo Toyotaka

References

External links
Kitaro official web page 

1987 albums
Kitarō albums